Aksubayevo (Aqsubay) is an urban locality (an urban-type settlement) and the administrative center of Aksubayevsky District in the Republic of Tatarstan, Russia, located on the banks of the Malaya Sulcha River,  southeast of the republic's capital of Kazan. As of the 2010 Census, its population was 10,008.

History
It was founded in 1771 and was granted urban-type settlement status in 1973.

Administrative and municipal status
Within the framework of administrative divisions, the urban-type settlement of Aksubayevo serves as the administrative center of Aksubayevsky District, of which it is a part. As a municipal division, Aksubayevo is incorporated within Aksubayevsky Municipal District as Aksubayevo Urban Settlement.

Transportation

References

Notes

Sources

Urban-type settlements in the Republic of Tatarstan
Chistopolsky Uyezd